Sumsion is a surname. Notable people with the surname include:

Herbert Sumsion (1899–1995), British organist
Ken Sumsion, American politician
Kyle Sumsion (born 1993), American rugby union player
Stephen M. Studdert, American presidential advisor
Terry Sumsion (1947-2011), Canadian country singer